The 2904, Transcontinental Motorized Vehicular Tournament of Efficiency and Endurance, known more commonly as The 2904 is an unofficial,  endurance race from New York City to California. Conceived by John Ficarra, as a combination of the Cannonball Baker Sea-To-Shining-Sea Memorial Trophy Dash and the 24 Hours of LeMons.

Overview
The rules are simple: drive the 2904 miles from NYC to CA for no more than $2904 including the vehicle, fuel, food, tolls, repairs, and tickets. Safety equipment such as tires, mandatory exterior lights, and seat belts are exempt from the budget.

The start is at the Redball Garage on East 31st Street in Manhattan where the original Cannonball began, and the finish has been in both San Francisco and at the Portofino Inn in Redondo Beach where the original Cannonball finished.

History
Conceived by John Ficarra, The 2904 arose as a response to the high-end “lifestyle” automotive rallies such as Bullrun and Gumball 3000. It also serves as a response to the high-dollar coast to coast record attempts by Alexander Roy, as well as drawing inspiration from endurance events like The 24 Hours of LeMons and the original Cannonball Baker Sea-To-Shining-Sea Memorial Trophy Dash.

Results
2015 - New York City to Redondo Beach
 Great White Whale: 32 hours 5 minutes (2002 Mercedes S55)
 Colonel Klunk: 32 hours 26 minutes
 P71 Blackturd: 33 hours 3 minutes (Ford Crown Vic)
 Kamikaze Subterfuge (Solo): 34 hours 33 minutes
 Moral Ambiguity (Solo): 35 hours 8 minutes
 The A-Way-Team: 36 hours 48 minutes (1995 Oldsmobile Silhouette)
 Dukes of Yavin: 43 hours 04 minutes (Ford Crown Vic)
 Omega Men: 44 hours (Oldsmobile Omega)
 Golden Years / AWOL: DNF (1973 GMC Motorhome)
2013 - New York City to Redondo Beach
 Cleveland Steamers (AKA Amish Anarchists): 36 hours, 27 minutes. (1993 Lincoln Town Car)
 No H8N: 37 hours, 29 minutes. (1999 Cadillac Funeral Limousine)
 Hal Needham's Ghost: 38 hours, 25 minutes. (1997 Ford Diesel Ambulance)
 OmegaRU: 42 hours, 33 minutes. (1985 Subaru Loyale Wagon)
 Tailpipes: 50 hours, 30 minutes. (1992 Chevrolet Cavalier, 2013 Hyundai Elantra - rental, 2013 Dodge Charger -rental)
2011 - New York City to San Francisco
 Collateral Racing Thrust (Solo): 40 hours, 25 minutes (1994 Mercury Grand Marquis)
 Wolverine's a Pimp: 43 hours, 3 minutes (1983 Jaguar XJ-S with Chevy V8)
2010 - New York City to San Francisco
 Civil Disobedience (Solo): 37 hours, 35 minutes (2001 Toyota Celica)  Budget: $2413.67
 Amish Anarchists: 38 hours, 44 minutes (1989 Mercedes-Benz 560SEL) Budget: $2685.60
 Rustbucketeers: 40 hours, 4 minutes (1994 Buick Roadmaster Station Wagon) Budget: $1776.33
 The Griswolds: 47 hours, 32 minutes (1987 Oldsmobile 88 Custom Cruiser Station Wagon) Budget: $1326.75
2009 - New York City to San Francisco

Team The A-Team: 37 hours, 8 minutes. (1984 GMC Van - Commando Spec) Budget: $2569.69
Team Project Interceptor: 38 hours, 29 minutes (1999 Ford Crown Victoria - Police Spec) Budget: $2074.50
Team Cookin' With-Gas: 43 hours, 15 minutes (1979 Lincoln Mark V Coupe) Budget $2200.03

2008 - New York City to San Francisco

Team Creative Film Cars: 38 hours, 41 minutes (1996 Chevrolet Caprice Classic – Police Spec) Budget: 2659.14
Team Flying Hellish AKA Stealth Bucket: 40 hours, 59 minutes (2000 Buick Regal LS)  Budget: $1478.77
Team CFC2, Electric Boogaloo: 41 hours, 9 minutes (1996 Ford Crown Victoria – Police Spec) Budget: $2437.24
Team Wheels on Meals: 45 hours, 8 minutes (1995 Honda Accord) Budget: $1098.16
Team Top Gear: 52 hours, 50 minutes (1995 Chevrolet Caprice Classic – Police Spec) Budget $2343.69

2007 - New York City to San Francisco

Team Flying Hellfish: 37 hours, 54 minutes (1992 Volvo 740 Wagon) Budget: $1778.10
Team Creative Film Cars: 40 hours, 8 minutes (1994 Subaru Loyale 4×4 Wagon) Budget: $1748.93
Team Tailpipes: 46 hours, 41 minutes (1991 Subaru Loyale Sedan) Budget: $826.69

References

 The 2904 Rules
 Top Gear Magazine January 2009
 Riverfront Times

External links
 
 The 2904 official site
 Top Gear.com live blog coverage of 2008 run
  Jalopnik.com
 Brigid Bergin 2007 coverage

Endurance motor racing